Take Good Care of My Baby was Bobby Vinton's seventeenth studio album, released in 1968. The title track was previously a hit for Bobby Vee. Other cover versions include "I Apologize" and "Serenade of the Bells". The title track is the album's most successful single.  "Sentimental Me" was also released as a single and was awarded the Top Song Award by the American Jukebox Association in 1968.

Track listing

Personnel
Bobby Vinton – vocals
 Billy Sherrill – producer

Charts
Album – Billboard (North America)

Singles – Billboard (North America)

References

1968 albums
Bobby Vinton albums
Albums produced by Billy Sherrill
Epic Records albums